Act Without Words may refer to:

Act Without Words I, play by Samuel Beckett
Act Without Words II, play by Samuel Beckett